Agah-e Sofla (also Romanized as Āgāh-e Soflá) is a village in Kivanat Rural District, Kolyai District, Sonqor County, Kermanshah Province, Iran. At the 2006 census, its population was 106, in 29 families.

References 

Populated places in Sonqor County